Jean Paul Farrugia (born 21 March 1992) is a Maltese professional footballer who currently plays for Sliema Wanderers.

International career
Farrugia played his first international game with the senior national team on 4 June 2014 in and against Gibraltar (1–0), after he came on as a substitute for André Schembri in the 74th minute of that game. He scored his first goal on March 26, 2017 against Slovakia.

International goals
Scores and results list Malta's goal tally first.

Honours
Hibernians
Maltese League (2): 2008–09, 2014–15
Maltese FA Trophy (1): 2012–13
Sliema Wanderers
Maltese FA Trophy (1): 2015–16

References

External links
 

1992 births
Living people
People from Pietà, Malta
Maltese footballers
Malta international footballers
Association football forwards
Hibernians F.C. players
Marsaxlokk F.C. players
FC Chiasso players
FC Spartak Trnava players
Slovak Super Liga players
Maltese Premier League players
Swiss Challenge League players
Expatriate footballers in Switzerland
Expatriate footballers in Slovakia
Maltese expatriate sportspeople in Slovakia
Maltese expatriate sportspeople in Switzerland